Stoyan Petrov Danev (28 January 1858, in Şumnu, Ottoman Empire (today Shumen) – 30 July 1949) was a leading Bulgarian liberal politician and twice Prime Minister.

A legal graduate of both the University of Heidelberg and the University of Paris, Danev served in a number of Ministerial roles, including Foreign Minister, and became known as a strong supporter of Imperial Russia. During Danev's first period of Prime Minister (which began on 4 January 1902) the question of the Macedonians came to the fore. A group known as the Macedonian Supreme Committee had been established in Sofia by Trayko Kitanchev which aimed to reclaim Macedonian land from the Ottoman Empire. In 1902 the group launched an uprising in the Struma River region, although it was put down and Danev, under advice from Russia, outlawed the movement. His reign was dogged by Macedonia from then until 1903 when he was removed from office due to fear of an all out Macedonian uprising, as well as his opposition to the warlike Macedonian bands who enjoyed some popular support in Bulgaria, and replaced by General Racho Petrov.

Danev went on to serve in a number of moderate coalition governments and was a signatory of the Treaty of London. When it became clear that Tsar Ferdinand did not intend honouring the treaty Danev was chosen to succeed Ivan Evstratiev Geshov as Prime Minister, although his second ministry proved brief. He was Minister of Finance from 1916 to 1920.

Longevity

References

1858 births
1949 deaths
Chairpersons of the National Assembly of Bulgaria
People from Shumen
Prime Ministers of Bulgaria
Finance ministers of Bulgaria
Heidelberg University alumni
University of Paris alumni
Bulgarian people of the Balkan Wars
Bulgarian expatriates in France
Bulgarian expatriates in Germany